Georg Werth (born 21 January 1951) is an Italian bobsledder. He competed in the two man and the four man events at the 1980 Winter Olympics.

References

1951 births
Living people
Italian male bobsledders
Olympic bobsledders of Italy
Bobsledders at the 1980 Winter Olympics
Place of birth missing (living people)